Damaged is the second album from alternative rock group Course of Nature, and their first in six years. Damaged was released on January 29, 2008, and would be the band's final album prior to their breakup in 2011.

Track listing 
All songs written by Mark Wilkerson. 
Anger Cage - 3:05
Right Before My Eyes - 4:33
Time Is Slipping Away - 3:07
Memory Of You - 3:46
The Window - 3:13
Live Again - 3:49
Gone - 4:42
How Great You Are - 3:53
World At War - 3:19
Forget Her - 4:41

References

Course of Nature albums
2008 albums
Albums produced by David Bendeth